Ali Raza (born 10 December 1974) is a Pakistani former first-class cricketer who played for several domestic teams in Pakistan between 1996 and 2003.

References

External links
 

1974 births
Living people
Pakistani cricketers
Karachi cricketers
Pakistan Customs cricketers
Pakistan National Shipping Corporation cricketers
Public Works Department cricketers
Cricketers from Karachi